Paradiso is an Italian surname. Notable people with the surname include:

Amerigo Paradiso (born 1962), Italian footballer
Angelo Paradiso (born 1977), Italian footballer
Joseph A. Paradiso, American academic
Michael Paradiso, American neuroscientist
Vincent Paradiso, American ballet dancer

Italian-language surnames